Football Bourg-en-Bresse Péronnas 01 is a French association football team founded in 1942. They are based in Bourg-en-Bresse, Auvergne-Rhône-Alpes, France, and play in Championnat National, the third tier of the French football league system. They play at the Stade Marcel-Verchère in Bourg-en-Bresse, which has a capacity of 11,400.

History

2015–2020: Professional football 
The club was promoted to Ligue 2 by virtue of being a point ahead of Strasbourg following their 2–0 victory over US Boulogne. After being the first football club in the Ain participating in the National 2 in 1994, FC Bourg-Péronnas were  the first football club of the department to play at the professional level.

In July 2015, the club changed its name to Football Bourg-en-Bresse Péronnas 01.

The club was relegated at the end of the 2017–18 Ligue 2 season, after losing the relegation play-off to Grenoble.

On 2 July 2020 the French football federation's financial body, the DNCG, announced the end of the clubs professional status.

Performance by league

Crest evolution

Coaching staff 
 Trainer:  Karim Mokeddem

Current squad

Managers

References

External links 

 
Bourg-Perronas
1942 establishments in France
Football clubs in Auvergne-Rhône-Alpes
Sport in Ain